American author Dan Savage (born October 7, 1964) has written six books, op-ed pieces in The New York Times, and an advice column on sexual issues in The Stranger (an alternative newspaper from Seattle, Washington). A graduate of the University of Illinois at Urbana–Champaign, Savage began contributing a column, Savage Love, to The Stranger from its inception in 1991. By 1998 his column had a readership of four million. He was Associate Editor at the newspaper from 1991 to 2001, when he became its editor-in-chief, later becoming its editorial director in 2007.

Savage's books have had successful sales results and have been generally well received. Savage Love: Straight Answers from America's Most Popular Sex Columnist was published in 1998 and features selections from his advice column. His next book The Kid: What Happened After My Boyfriend and I Decided to Go Get Pregnant was published in 1999, and recounts his experiences with his boyfriend whilst deciding to adopt a child. The book received a PEN West Award for Excellence in Creative Nonfiction, and an Off-Broadway musical based on the work was the recipient of the BMI Foundation Jerry Bock Award for Excellence in Musical Theatre. Skipping Towards Gomorrah: The Seven Deadly Sins and the Pursuit of Happiness in America, published in 2002, describes the author's experiences indulging in the seven deadly sins. The book was featured in The Best American Sex Writing 2004, and won a Lambda Literary Award.

Savage's 2005 book The Commitment: Love, Sex, Marriage, and My Family, recounting his personal experience deciding to marry his partner Terry Miller and analyzing same-sex marriage, reached The New York Times Best Seller list, and Nielsen BookScan noted it sold approximately 300,000 copies. After founding the It Gets Better Project in 2010 to reach out to teenagers after incidents of suicide among LGBT youth, his edited compilation of submissions It Gets Better: Coming Out, Overcoming Bullying, and Creating a Life Worth Living was published in 2011. The book features notable contributors, including David Sedaris, Hillary Clinton, and Barack Obama. Sales of the book were successful, and IndieBound reported it reached a list of best-sellers in the United States less than one week after publication. It reached 16th on The New York Times Best Seller list in April 2011. Savage collaborated with Lindy West, Christopher Frizzelle, and Bethany Jean Clement on a college guide, How to Be a Person, which was published in 2012. His 2013 book American Savage reflects on Savage's experiences throughout the founding of the It Gets Better Project and was well received by The Washington Post and the Seattle Post-Intelligencer.

Works

Books

Author

Editor

Contributor

Newspapers edited

The Stranger (Seattle, Washington: Tim Keck; Index Newspapers, LLC). .
Savage served as Associate Editor from 1991 to April 4, 2001, when he became editor-in-chief.
He became editorial director in September 2007.

Advice column
 1991–present
By 1998, Savage's advice column had a total of 4 million readers, and was syndicated to 21 newspapers located in Canada and the United States.

Internet

"It Gets Better", part of the It Gets Better Project (YouTube), with Terry Miller (September 21, 2010)

Television
This American Life Live!, Bard Entertainment, National CineMedia, with Mike Birbiglia, Ira Glass, Starlee Kine, Joss Whedon (2009)
Savage appeared on a live episode of This American Life in 2009, where he criticized the Catholic Church and discussed his views on atheism. He reflected on his experience during his mother's death.
It Gets Better: MTV Television Special (MTV; MTV Studios). February 21, 2012. 
It Gets Better was a collaborative project between MTV and the It Gets Better Project. Along with his partner Terry Miller, Savage hosted the episode and informed the audience about three youths and their experiences coming to terms with their LGBT status.
Savage U (MTV; MTV Studios). 2012.
MTV featured Savage in its program Savage U, wherein he traveled to college campuses in the United States to speak about sexuality and answer students' queries. The series premiered on MTV on April 3, 2012.
It Gets Better 2: MTV Television Special (MTV; MTV Studios). October 9, 2012.
It Gets Better 2 was hosted by Savage and featured an examination of LGBT young adults as they dealt with issues surrounding their alternative sexuality.
The Real O'Neals was a sitcom that aired on ABC from March 2, 2016, to March 14, 2017. The series was loosely based on Savage's early life, and he was also one of the show's executive producers.

Theatre
It's a Lon Mabon Christmas Carol, Charlie Brown (1993) — play produced by Greek Active, Seattle, Washington; Dan Savage directed and was credited as Keenan Hollahan. The play was co-written by Charles Smith.
Play was performed at the Tugs Belmont in Capitol Hill, Seattle, Washington. It's a Lon Mabon Christmas Carol, Charlie Brown was an LGBT-themed adaptation of A Christmas Carol by Charles Dickens. The play included a satire of activist Lon Mabon, and a parody of A Charlie Brown Christmas. Performances by two actors in the production received recognition by The Seattle Times in the "Footlight Awards".
The Importance of Being Earnest (1993) — play produced by Greek Active, Seattle, Washington; Dan Savage directed and was credited as Keenan Hollahan.
Savage adapted the play from the original by Oscar Wilde. The original play was concurrently being performed at the Intiman Theatre in Seattle, Washington. Savage's adaptation was shown at the Re-Bar Tavern and was billed as the "queer version" of the Intiman Theatre production. The play was styled in the form of a cabaret.
The Comedy of Errors (1993) — play produced by Greek Active, Seattle, Washington; Dan Savage directed and was credited as Keenan Hollahan.
Male actors took the roles of females, and actresses portrayed the male characters in the play.
Macbeth (1994) — play produced by Greek Active, Seattle, Washington; Dan Savage interpreted and adapted the play from the original William Shakespeare and directed; he was credited as Keenan Hollahan.
Savage incorporated gender reversal for the actors cast to portray the male and female roles. The play was successful and its run was extended for an additional month past its intended wrap date.
Macbeth as adapted by Savage and produced for Greek Active was performed again in 1996; with Savage as director.
Mourning Becomes Electra (1994) — play produced by Greek Active, Seattle, Washington; Dan Savage directed and was credited as Keenan Hollahan.
Savage adapted the piece from the original play by Eugene O'Neill. He chose to select a slate of only men as actors, and compressed the running time from six hours to two and a half.
A Christmas Carol (1994) — play produced by Greek Active, Seattle, Washington; Dan Savage directed and was credited as Keenan Hollahan.
Savage modified the production to incorporate cross-dressing actors.
Saint Joan (1995) — play produced by Greek Active, Seattle, Washington; Dan Savage directed and was credited as Keenan Hollahan.
Savage adapted the play from the original by George Bernard Shaw; Shaw himself is included as a character in the production, who appears to inspect the set and then is pulled offstage.
Winner of the 1995 Seattle Pretty Inclusive Theater (SPIT) Award in the comedy category.
The Best Man (1996) — play produced by Greek Active, Seattle, Washington; Dan Savage directed and was credited as Keenan Hollahan.
Savage adapted the play from the original by Gore Vidal. Male actors performed roles of both men and women characters. Savage updated the play to make to more relevant to ongoing political elections at the time.
The Children's Hour (1996) — play produced by Greek Active, Seattle, Washington; Dan Savage directed and was credited as Keenan Hollahan.
The play was an adaptation of the original by Lillian Hellman. Classmates at an educational institution in the Southern United States were played by lesbian women; drag queen men were cast as the instructors at the school that the students claimed were lesbians.
Egguus (2001) — play performed at Consolidated Works, Seattle, Washington; Dan Savage wrote and directed the adaptation and was credited as Keenan Hollahan.
Egguus was an adaptation by Savage from the 1973 play Equus by Peter Shaffer.

The Kid (2010), Michael Zam (book), Andy Monroe (music), Jack Lechner (lyrics). Off-Broadway, Theatre Row, New York City, The New Group.
Musical adaptation based on Savage's book The Kid: What Happened After My Boyfriend and I Decided to Go Get Pregnant; Savage gave feedback to the production team during the adaptation process, and provided them with numerous notes and comments. Savage stated in an interview with Time Out New York, that the production team were responsive to his feedback.
The Kid was recognized with the 2009 BMI Foundation Jerry Bock Award for Excellence in Musical Theatre, in the category of Best New Musical. Composer Jerry Bock, a Pulitzer Prize and Tony Award recipient, chose the BMI Lehman Engel Musical Theater Workshop-developed musical himself to receive the award. It received nominations in 2011 for five Drama Desk Awards including Outstanding Musical, Outstanding Lyrics, and Outstanding Book of a Musical; in addition to nominations for a Lucille Lortel Award and a GLAAD Media Award. The Kid won the 2011 Outer Critics Circle Award in the category of Outstanding New Off-Broadway Musical.
Miracle! (2012) written and directed by Dan Savage, performed at Intiman Playhouse, Seattle, Washington.
Savage wrote the play as a parody of The Miracle Worker, utilizing drag queen actors.
It Gets Better Tour (2013). Collaboration between the Gay Men's Chorus of Los Angeles with Dan Savage and others including Lily Tomlin and LeAnn Rimes.

Articles

The Capital Times

The New York Times

Seattle Post-Intelligencer

Slate magazine

Wisconsin State Journal

Awards

See also
Gay literature
LGBT social movements
List of LGBT writers

References

Further reading

External links

 Savage U – Savage's MTV show
 Savage Love  – Savage's weekly sex advice column
 Savage's podcasts
 

Dan Savage
Bibliographies by writer
Journalism bibliographies
Bibliographies of American writers
Dramatist and playwright bibliographies
Articles containing video clips